Brewer's blackbird (Euphagus cyanocephalus) is a medium-sized New World blackbird. It is named after the ornithologist Thomas Mayo Brewer.

Description 
Adult males have black plumage with an iridescent purple head and neck and glossy bluish-green highlights on the rest of the body. The feet and legs are black and the eye is bright yellow. The female is brownish-grey with slight hints of the male's iridescence. The female's eye is dark brown, while the male's is bright yellow. Overall, they resemble the eastern member of the same genus, the rusty blackbird; the Brewer's blackbird, however, has a shorter bill and the male's head is iridescent purple. This bird is often mistaken for the common grackle but has a shorter tail. The call is a sharp check which is also distinguishable. This bird is in a different family from the Eurasian blackbird.

Habitat
Their breeding habitat is open and semi-open areas, often near water, across central and western North America.  They are also very common in parking lots, and easily acclimate to the presence of people.

These birds are often permanent residents in the west. Other birds migrate to the Southeastern United States and Mexico in Spring. The range of this bird has been expanding east in the Great Lakes region.

Feeding
They forage in shallow water or in fields, mainly eating seeds and insects, some berries. They sometimes catch insects in flight. They feed in flocks outside of the breeding season, sometimes with other blackbirds. In marshy areas, they are known to stand on aquatic plants and wade in shallow water to catch insects. Some have even been known to eat smaller mammals, amphibians, and the nestlings of other birds.

Reproduction 

Their clutch size can vary, usually between 3-7. Eggs are usually a tan color with darker speckles throughout to allow for camouflage. The female bird primarily incubates for 12-14 days.

Nests are not built in isolation, but in colonies of up to 30 pairs. Pairs prefer to nest in areas that are around 20-40' in treetops. However, colonies that live near water may also nest in reeds and other freshwater plants. Nests are made from nearby material such as reeds, sticks and hair. They are built by the female in a cup-like shape and are bonded with mud or other securing substances. The color of the nest usually matches the coloration of the eggs and the surrounding environment as it is crucial to survival.

Protected status
The Brewer's blackbird (Euphagus cyanocephalus) is protected in the United States under the Migratory Bird Treaty Act of 1918, however exceptions are granted under 50 CFR part 21 (2014)  for animals committing or about to commit depredations upon ornamental or shade trees, agricultural crops, livestock, or wildlife, or when concentrated in such numbers and manner that they are a health hazard or other nuisance.

Gallery

References

External links 

 
 
 
 
 
 

Brewer's blackbird
Brewer's blackbird
Native birds of Western Canada
Native birds of the Canadian Prairies
Native birds of the Western United States
Native birds of the Plains-Midwest (United States)
Fauna of the San Francisco Bay Area
Brewer's blackbird